Dioon holmgrenii is a species of cycad in the family Zamiaceae. It is endemic to Mexico, where it occurs only in an area just to the southwest of San Gabriel Mixtepec, Oaxaca. It is known by the common name palma del sol (sun palm).

This plant grows in humid pine-oak forest habitat.

There are only two known subpopulations.

References

External links
 Dioon holmgrenii, Tropicos
 
 

holmgrenii
Endemic flora of Mexico
Flora of Oaxaca
Endangered biota of Mexico
Endangered flora of North America
Plants described in 1981
Flora of the Sierra Madre del Sur